Chingford Foundation School is a coeducational state secondary school and sixth form located in Chingford in the London Borough of Waltham Forest. It is a specialist Humanities College and has been an academy since October 2012.

History
Chingford Foundation School (a co-educational all-inclusive school) was opened in 1938, in temporary premises at Hawkwood House in Yardley Lane under the control of Essex County Council, as Chingford County High School. In the following year it was evacuated to the west of England and it did not begin to occupy its present buildings in Nevin Drive until 1941. The school was enlarged in 1957. In 1968, secondary schools in Waltham Forest, to which Chingford had been transferred in 1965, adopted the Comprehensive system. It became Chingford Senior High School with a mixed-ability intake of 14- to 18-year-olds. In the 1980s, pupils aged 11 to 14 studied at Chingford junior high school in Wellington Avenue, which later became a primary school, and then moved to Chingford to senior school to take GCSEs. In the 1980s, pupils aged 11 to 14 studied at Chingford junior high school in Wellington Avenue, which later became a primary school, and then moved to Chingford to senior school to take O levels and later, GCSEs. In the late 80s early 90s, the six form was abolished, and six form pupils moved to either Sir George Monoux college or Leyton sixth form college. Following another borough-wide reorganisation programme in 1986, and a further name change to Chingford School. In 1993, the school became grant maintained, giving the school direct government funding and autonomy from the local authority. This allowed the school to re-establish its sixth form facility, for years 12 and 13. A new Sixth Form Centre was opened in 1997.

In 2000 the school became a foundation school, meaning that the school is maintained by the local authority but the governors are responsible for their own admission policy and procedures.
The current headteacher of the school is Jane Benton who took control replacing Mark Morall in 2019.

Between July 2006 and July 2007 the school had extensive building works, in which a new sports hall and staff room were built.

Since converting to an academy, the school is now run by the Chingford Academies Trust, which also includes South Chingford Foundation School.

Notable alumni
 James Alexandrou, actor, formerly in EastEnders
 Brian Altman, barrister
 David Beckham, professional footballer, Manchester United, Real Madrid, Milan, LA Galaxy, Paris Saint-Germain. England international
 Daniel Clark, professional basketball player
 Ella Clark, professional basketball player
 Daniel Fogg, swimmer
 Brian Galach, professional footballer, Crawley Town, Poland International
 Dwight Gayle, professional footballer with Newcastle United
 Sir Peter Harding, former Marshal of the Royal Air Force, Royal Air Force Chief of the Air Staff, and Chief of Defence Staff (professional head of the British Armed Forces)
 Sir Jonathan Ive, designer, Apple Computers
 Harry Kane, professional footballer, Tottenham Hotspur, England international
Michael Obafemi, professional footballer, Swansea City
 John Parslow, ornithologist
Steve Rosenberg, journalist, BBC's Moscow correspondent

External links
Official website
Old Chingfordians website

References

Academies in the London Borough of Waltham Forest
Secondary schools in the London Borough of Waltham Forest
Chingford